Michele Morgan (born 1970) is an American film/television and voice-over actress who was part of the rap group BWP.

Filmography

References

External links
 

Living people
1970 births
African-American actresses
20th-century American actresses
21st-century American actresses
American voice actresses
American video game actresses
American film actresses
American television actresses
20th-century African-American women
20th-century African-American people
21st-century African-American women
21st-century African-American people